Qermez Tappeh (also Romanized as Qarmaz Tepe) is a village in Sharifabad Rural District, Sharifabad District, Pakdasht County, Tehran Province, Iran. At the 2006 census, its population was 1,195, in 309 families.

References 

Populated places in Pakdasht County